Empress Myeongseong is a 2001 and 2002 South Korean television series that aired on KBS2.

Historical connection

Empress Myeongseong was considered as the last empress of Korea because of the Eulmi Incident (also called Operation Fox Hunt).

Cast

Main 
Choi Myung-gil as Empress Myeongseong (episodes 82-124)
Lee Mi-yeon as Empress Myeongseong (episodes 1, 10-81)
Moon Geun-young as Min Ja-yeong (young Empress Myeongseong)
Lee Jin-woo as King Gojong
Lee In as young Gojong
Yoo Dong-geun as Heungseon Daewongun

Supporting 
Royal Family

Kim Yong-rim - Grand Royal Queen Dowager Jo
Kim Jeong-ha - Royal Queen Dowager Hong
Yoo Hye-young - Queen Cheorin
 Baek Seung-woo - Sungjong of Korea 
Lee Tae-ri and Kwak Jung-wook - young Sunjong
 Lee Yu-ri - Empress Sunmyeong
 Park Eun-bin and Kim Soo-yeong - young Empress Sunmyeong
Jung Seon-gyeong - Royal Consort Gwi-in of Gyeongju Yi clan
Lee Jae-eun - Royal Consort Gwi-in of the Deoksu Jang clan
 Kim Se-ah - Royal Consort Gwi-in of the Haeju Jeong clan 
 Seo Mi-ae - Imperial Noble Consort Sunheon of the Yeongwol Eom clan
 Kang Seong-hyeon - Prince Wanhwa; Consort Yi Gwi-in’s son
 Kang Seong-min - Prince Uihwa; Consort Jang Gwi-in’s son
 Kim Jong-ho and Lee Pung-woon - young Prince Uihwa
 Lee Ju-eun - Kim Su-deok, Princess Consort Yeongwon; Prince Uihwa’s wife

Palace/Inner Court

 Hwang Beom-sik - Palace Lady Lee; Gojong’s servant
 Lee Geon - Palace Lady Kang; Empress Myeongseong’s servant
 Kim Bo-mi - Palace Lady Hong; Hong Gye-hoon’s younger sister
 Hong Yeo-jin - Palace Lady Yun; Grand Queen Dowager Jo’s servant
 Lee Ji-eun - Palace Lady of Junggung Hall
 Yoon Yeong-ju - Palace Lady of Daejeon Hall
 Choi Yeong-wan - Consort Yi Gwi-in’s servant
Hong Il-gwon - Hong Gye-hoon; Palace Lady Hong's elder brother

Empress Myeongseong’s family/Yeoheung Min clan

Sunwoo Eun-sook - Lady Yi of Gamgodang; Min Ja-yeong's mother and Min Chi-rok's wife
Lee Do-ryeon - Min Chi-rok; Min Ja-yeong’s father
Kim Hyo-won - Min Seung-ho; Empress Myeongseong’s adoptive older brother 
Kim Seong-han - Min Gyeom-ho; Empress Myeongseong’s adoptive uncle
Hyeon Seok - Min Tae-ho; Empress Sunmyeong’s father
Kim Byeong-se - Min Gyu-ho 
Kim Bong-geun - Min Yeong-wi 
Kim Gwang-yeong - Min Yeong-ik; Empress Sunmyeong’s older brother
Kim Yeong-gi - Min Eung-sik

Unhyeon Palace

Lee Deok-hee - Min, the Consort Princess to the Prince of the Great Court (Heungseon Daewongun's wife; Gojong's mother)
Han Beom-hee - Yi Jae-myeon
 Ahn Seung-min - Yi Jun-yong; Heungseon Daewongun’s grandson and Gojong’s nephew 
 Jeong Jin-gak - Cheon Hui-yeon; Heungseon Daewongun’s henchman
 Yoo Jong-geun - Jang Sun-gyu; Heungseon Daewongun’s henchman
 Lee Gi-yeol - Ha Jeong-il; Heungseon Daewongun’s henchman
 Jeong Jin-hwa - Ahn Pil-ju; Heungseon Daewongun’s henchman
 Lee Gyeong-yeong - Heo Ok; Heungseon Daewongun’s henchman
 Kim Hyeseon - Chuwol; Heungseon Daewongun’s concubine 
 Lee Hyeon-gyeong - Ok San
 Ki Jeong-su - Shin Cheol-gyun 
 Lee Won-yong - Ahn Gi-yeong
 Lee Woo-seok - Yi Jae-seon

Imo Incident

 Kim Seong-hwan - Min Gyeom-ho; Grand Princess Min’s younger brother
 Maeng Ho-rim - Kim Bo-hyeon 
 Lee Jae-yeon - Kim Chun-yeong
 Kim Dae-hwan - Yoo Bok-man
 Kim Jin-tae - Kim Jeong-son
 Kim Ji-bok - Yoo Chun-man
 Kim Tae-hyeong - Administrator Seon Hye-jeong 
 Yun Gwan-yong - Sim Sang-hun

Gapsin Coup

 Lee Byeong-ok - Kim Ok-gyun
 Cha Cheol-su - Park Yeong-hyo
 Lee Won-hui - Hong Yeong-sik 
 Hong Jeong-ok - Seo Jae-pil
 Lee Gi-chil - Yun Chi-ho

Donghak Peasant Revolution

 Jeong Byeong-ok - Jeon Bong-jun
 Lee Gye-yeong - Dong Hak-gun

Eulmi Incident

 Hong Il-kwon - Hong Gye-hoon; Palace Lady Hong’s older brother and palace bodyguard who protected Empress Myeongseong at the time of the Imo Incident and gained trust. After that, he continued to protect Empress Myeongseong, but was killed while resisting the Japanese during the Eulmi Incident.
 Kim Jun-mo - Lee Gyeong-jik
 Oh Seong-yeol - Woo Beom-seon 
 Kim Bong-geun - Yun Seok-woon 
 Yun Tae-sul - Hullyeondae soldier

Extended

 Lee Yeong-hu - Prince Heungin; Heungseon Daewongun’s older brother 
 Eom Yoo-shin - Prince Heungin’s wife
 Jeon In-taek - Lee Yong-ik 
 Kim Sang-sun - Jo Du-sun
 Choi Sang-hun - Jo Yeong-ha; Grand Queen Royal Dowager Jo’s 5th cousin
 Song Jae-ho - Kim Jwa-geun; Queen Cheorin’s relative and head of the Andong Kim clan
 Park Yeong-ji - Kim Byeong-hak
 Jeong Seong-mo - Kim Byeong-gi; Kim Jwa-geun’s adoptive son 
 Park Cheol-ho - Kim Byeong-guk; Kim Byeong-hak’s younger brother
 Im Byeong-gi - Kim Byeong-si 
 Kwon Ki-seon - Kim Byeong-si’s wife
 Kim Ju-yeong - Lee Gyeong-ha 
 Heo Gi-ho - Yi Jae-won; Heungseon Daewongun’s nephew and Gojong’s cousin
 Jeon Seong-hwan - Shin Heon 
 Yun Sun-cheol - Lee Yu-won
 Yun Deok-yong - Hong Sun-mok; Father of Hong Young-sik. He commits suicide when his son is murdered in the Gapsin coup
 Lee Shin-jae - Sim Soon-taek
 Seo Kwon-sun - Sim Soon-taek’s wife
 Park Chil-yong - Kang Ro
 Kim In-tae - Shin Eung-jo
 Yang Yeong-jun - Jeong Gi-hoe
 Kim Gyeong-ha - Yang Hyeon-su
 Yu Byeong-jun - Han Gye-won
 Kang Man-hui - Yun Ung-ryeol
 Heo Hyeon-ho - Park Gyu-su
 Jang Gi-yong - Kim Yun-sik
 Kim Hyeong-il - Eo Yun-jong
 Kim Tae-gi - Kim Hong-jib
 Kang In-gi - Yi Wan-yong
 Lee Dae-ro - Choi Ik-hyeon
 Kim Rin - Lee Gyeong-ha

Japanese Legation Group

 Lee Il-ung - Kuroda Kiyotaka
 Seo Sang-ik - Hanabusa Yoshitada
 Park Geun-hyeong - Inoue Kaoru
 Im Hyeok - Miura Gorō
 Kim Byeong-gi - Okamoto Ryūnosuke
 Yun Ju-sang - Itō Hirobumi
 Kang Tae-gi - Mutsu Munemitsu
 Kim Ha-gyun - Saionji Kinmochi
 Kim Sang-sun - Daekjoe Shinichiro
 Lee Do-ryeon - Shiba Shirō/Tokai Sanshi
 Kim Seong-ryeong - Michikko
 Jeong Ui-gab - Japanese man Sasaki
 Yang Jae-won - Japanese military officer

Qing Dynasty figures

 Nam Il-woo - Li Hongzhang
 Park Jin-seong - Yuan Shikai
 Park Yong-sik - Ma Geon-chong
 Park Gyeong-deuk - Wu Changqing
 Kwon Hyeok-ho - Jeong Yeo-chang 
 Lee Cham - Mok In-deok

Russian figures

 ? - Karl Ivanovich Weber; He strives to expand Russian power in Joseon through the Imperial Russian Federation. When Empress Myeongseong leans toward her pro-Russia, she actively cooperates with it (discussing arms imports), but is consistent with a passive attitude when the Eulmi Incident takes place. Later, when the Agwan collapse occurred, he led the pro-Russian cabinet and tried to gain interest in Korea.
 Kim Jin-ah - Sontak; German-Russian woman. Executioner of Weber and interpreter of the Imperial Russian Legation. She speaks fluent Russian in a scene where Prince Weber and Empress Myeongseong discuss arms imports.

Britain figures

 ? - Isabella Bird; An English geographer and writer who wrote Korea and its neighbors, a story of her travels to Joseon. In the first scene of episode 1, a western woman played Isabella Budd Bishop, who is clumsy in the Joseon Dynasty, but eats rice with chopsticks.

American figures 
 ? - Dayi; A foreign training instructor who disbanded a training unit trained by a Japanese military officer and took charge of training the newly created demonstrators. At the time of the Eulmi Incident, he led the protesters against the Japanese army, but was defeated and taken prisoner due to the inferiority of the troops.

Notes

Two Empress Myeongseong Actresses
It was reported that Lee Mi-Yeon signed a contract with KBS for this drama for only 100 episodes. However, due to high viewership rates, KBS wanted to extend the episodes for more than 100 originally. Since Lee Mi-Yeon wanted to stick with the original contract, she refused to do more 
than 100 episodes. However, KBS said still extended Empress Myeongseong and had Choi Myung-Gil for the role. Lee Mi-Yeon's last episode was Episode 81 and Choi Myung-Gil started at Episode 82. The viewers should not be confused as Lee Mi-Yeon also had a death scene which is actually a music video for the OST.

Awards
2001 KBS Drama Awards
Top Excellence Award, Actress: Lee Mi-yeon
Best Supporting Actor: Kim Sung-hwan
Best Supporting Actress: Kim Bo-mi
PD of the Year Award: Yoon Chang-bum

2002 Baeksang Arts Awards
Best Actor in TV: Yoo Dong-geun

2002 KBS Drama Awards
Daesang/Grand Prize: Yoo Dong-geun
Top Excellence Award, Actress: Choi Myung-gil

See also
 The Last Empress (Broadway musical)

References

External links
  

Korean Broadcasting System television dramas
2001 South Korean television series debuts
2002 South Korean television series endings
South Korean historical television series
Television series by Samhwa Networks